The Peerage of Great Britain comprises all extant peerages created in the Kingdom of Great Britain between the Acts of Union 1707 and the Acts of Union 1800. It replaced the Peerage of England and the Peerage of Scotland, but was itself replaced by the Peerage of the United Kingdom in 1801.

The ranks of the Peerage of Great Britain are Duke, Marquess, Earl, Viscount and Baron. Until the passage of the House of Lords Act 1999, all peers of Great Britain could sit in the House of Lords.

Some peerages of Great Britain were created for peers in the Peerage of Scotland and Peerage of Ireland as they did not have an automatic seat in the House of Lords until the Peerage Act 1963 which gave Scottish Peers an automatic right to sit in the Lords.

In the following table of peers of Great Britain, holders of higher or equal titles in the other peerages are listed. Those peers who are known by a higher title in one of the other peerages are listed in italics.

Ranks 
The ranks of the peerage are Duke, Marquess, Earl, Viscount, and Baron.

Titles 

Marquesses, earls, viscounts and barons are all addressed as 'Lord X', where 'X' represents either their territory or surname pertaining to their title. Marchionesses, countesses, viscountesses and baronesses are all addressed as 'Lady X'. Dukes and duchesses are addressed just as 'Duke' or 'Duchess' or, in a non-social context, 'Your Grace'.

Creation of peers 
The last non-royal dukedom of Great Britain was created in 1766, and the last marquessate of Great Britain was created in 1796. Creation of the remaining ranks ceased when the United Kingdom of Great Britain and Ireland was formed; subsequent creations of peers were in the Peerage of the United Kingdom.

The last 8 (6 non-royal and two royal) people who were created hereditary peers (from 1798 to 1800) were:

Lists of peers 
 30 dukes: see List of dukes in the peerages of Britain and Ireland
 34 marquesses: see List of marquesses in the peerages of Britain and Ireland
 191 earls and countesses: see List of earls in the peerages of Britain and Ireland
 111 viscounts: see List of viscounts in the peerages of Britain and Ireland
 1,187 barons: see List of barons in the peerages of Britain and Ireland
 Women: see List of peerages created for women and List of peerages inherited by women

Lists of extant peerages

Extant dukedoms

Extant marquessates

Extant earldoms

Extant viscountcies

Extant baronies

Extinct peerages since the passage of the House of Lords Act 1999

Extinct baronies

Current titles without heirs

Current peers of Great Britain

Current Scottish and Irish peers with British titles
Currently none

See also 
 British nobility
 Dukes in the United Kingdom
 History of the British peerage
 Marquesses in the United Kingdom
 Peerage of England
 Peerage of Scotland
 Peerage of Ireland
 Peerages in the United Kingdom

Notes

References 
 The Roll of the Peerage, The Crown Office, Ministry of Justice

 
Great Britain